Volodymyr Ilyich Malyhin (Vladimir Ilyich Malygin; born 1 November 1949 in Voroshilovsk) is a retired Ukrainian and Soviet football player and a current Ukrainian coach.

His sons Aleksandr Malygin and Yuriy Malyhin played football professionally.

Honours
 Soviet Top League winner: 1972.

International career
Malyhin made his debut for USSR on 29 June 1972 in a friendly against Uruguay.

References
 Profile 

1949 births
Living people
Soviet footballers
Soviet Union international footballers
Ukrainian footballers
Soviet Top League players
FC Zorya Luhansk players
FC Hirnyk Rovenky players
Ukrainian football managers
Association football defenders
People from Alchevsk
Sportspeople from Luhansk Oblast